Judge Brody may refer to:

Anita B. Brody (born 1935), judge of the United States District Court for the Eastern District of Pennsylvania
Morton A. Brody (1933–2000), judge of the United States District Court for the District of Maine

See also
Margo Kitsy Brodie (born 1966), judge of the United States District Court for the Eastern District of New York